Fazal Elahi Khan is a Pakistani politician hailing from Peshawar District, who served as a member of the Provincial Assembly of Khyber Pakhtunkhwa from May 2013 to May 2018 and from August 2018 to January 2023, belonging to the Pakistan Tehreek-e-Insaf. He also served as the Parliamentary Secretary in Environmental Department.

Political career
Fazal Elahi was elected as the member of the Khyber Pakhtunkhwa Assembly on ticket of Pakistan Tehreek-e-Insaf from PK-06 (Peshawar-VI) in 2013 Pakistani general election.

References

Living people
People from Peshawar
Pakistan Tehreek-e-Insaf MPAs (Khyber Pakhtunkhwa)
Khyber Pakhtunkhwa MPAs 2013–2018
Year of birth missing (living people)